Thomas Howard, 14th Earl of Suffolk, 7th Earl of Berkshire (11 January 1721 – 3 February 1783) was a British peer, styled Hon. Thomas Howard until 1779.

Life
A younger son of Henry Howard, 11th Earl of Suffolk, he was educated at St John's College, Oxford, and received his MA in 1741. Called to the bar at the Inner Temple in 1744, he succeeded his elder brother William Howard, Viscount Andover as a Member of Parliament (MP) for Castle Rising in 1747. He represented Castle Rising until 1768, when he was returned for Malmesbury; he continued there until 1774, when he sat for Mitchell. He left the House of Commons in 1779, when he succeeded his great-nephew Henry as Earl of Suffolk. He became a bencher of the Inner Temple in 1779.

Upon his death in 1783, he was succeeded by a distant cousin, John.

Family
On 13 April 1747, Howard married Elizabeth Kingscote (b. 7 Mar 1721/22, d. 22 Jun 1769) on 13 August 1747 at Temple Church, London, by whom he had one daughter:

Lady Diana Howard (23 July 1748 – 20 June 1816), married Sir Michael le Fleming, 4th Baronet

The earl also had a natural daughter, Margaret Southwell, who on 27 March 1794 married, in Calcutta, Sir George Abercrombie Robinson, 1st Baronet with whom she had seven sons and a daughter.

References

1721 births
1783 deaths
Alumni of St John's College, Oxford
Howard, Thomas
Howard, Thomas
Howard, Thomas
Howard, Thomas
Howard, Thomas
Thomas
Thomas
Members of the Inner Temple
Howard, Thomas
Howard, Thomas